Drums and Guns is the eighth full-length album by indie rock band Low. It is the second album they recorded with producer Dave Fridmann (The Great Destroyer). The album was partially inspired by the war in Iraq. It was released on March 20, 2007, on Sub Pop records.

Musician Steve Adey covered "Murderer" on his 2017 LP Do Me a Kindness.

Track listing

Charts

References

External links
"Song of the Day: An Air of Portent That Borders on Menace", by Stephen Thompson, from NPR.org, April 2, 2007 (features "Belarus")

2007 albums
Low (band) albums
Sub Pop albums
Albums produced by Dave Fridmann
Albums recorded at Tarbox Road Studios